A fourchette piercing is a female genital piercing. It is a piercing done at the rear rim of the vulva, in the area of frenulum labiorum pudendi.  Many people do not have a pinchable flap of skin in the area, and are not suited for this piercing.  Otherwise, placement and piercing tends to be relatively easy.

Placement 
The fourchette piercing is most similar in location to the male guiche piercing.  It requires a pinchable flap of skin at the rear rim of the vulva.  Piercers should not pierce into the vaginal tissue or vaginal canal as the vaginal tissue often rejects the piercing.

Piercers 
Many piercers are not willing to do this piercing.  The fourchette is a rare piercing which requires the proper anatomy.  Many women do not have the pinchable flap of skin, making the fourchette undoable.

Healing and aftercare 
Healing time is relatively quick, as with all piercings in the genital area.  Healing time is usually around four to six weeks.  Hygiene is usually a concern; with the piercing's proximity to the anus, the wearer must ensure the area is well cleaned following defecation.

Wear 
Many wearers have reported that this piercing is prone to stretching on its own.  Discomfort with intercourse has been reported by some wearers, whereas some may find it quite pleasurable.  Migration and rejection of this piercing are fairly common.

References 

Female genital piercings